The 25th National Hockey League All-Star Game was held in the Metropolitan Sports Center in Bloomington, home of the Minnesota North Stars, on January 25, 1972. It was the first and only time the All-Star Game was held at the Metropolitan Sports Center. The East Division All-Stars defeated the West Division All-Stars 3–2. Bobby Orr was named the game's most valuable player.

League business
Clarence Campbell, president of the NHL announced that the NHL was expanding to Atlanta and Long Island. Campbell also indicated that the NHL would expand by two further teams for the 1974–75 season. The executives of the Central Hockey League and the Western Hockey League met to discuss the merger of their two leagues. The merger discussions were disrupted when Daniel Myers, owner of the Salt Lake Golden Eagles, committed suicide.

The game
It was the first time since 1956 that Gordie Howe did not play in the All-Star Game.

Summary

Source: Podnieks

Team Lineups

See also
1971–72 NHL season

References

 

All
National Hockey League All-Star Games
National Hockey League All-Star Game
National Hockey League All-Star Game